Will Glendinning is a former politician in Northern Ireland. He was born in Portadown, the brother of Robin, and a great-grandchild of Robert Glendinning.

Glendinning joined the Ulster Defence Regiment in the early 1970s and served in Armagh. In 1977, he was elected as an Alliance Party of Northern Ireland (APNI) councillor for Belfast Area F, which covered the Lower Falls, Donegall Road and Markets areas. He held his seat in 1981, and was also narrowly elected at the 1982 Northern Ireland Assembly election for West Belfast.

"Area F" was abolished in 1985 but Glendinning won a council seat in the Lower Falls Electoral Area, with his wife Pip succeeding in gaining a seat for APNI in the adjacent Upper Falls Area. He and his wife both resigned their council seats in 1987 due to the birth of their daughter.

He became the Chief Executive of the Community Relations Council, before becoming a consultant on "cultural diversity, community relations and transition from conflict" establishing the peace-building charity Diversity Challenges. He has served as Coordinator since 2002 Diversity Challenges worked with culturally specific groups including the Loyal Orders Bands, the GAA, and others to promote change to recognise the increasing cultural diversity.
He was chairperson of the Northern Ireland Asscoation of Citizens Advice Bureaux in the 1990s. He also served on the board of Community Technical Aid. He served on the board and was chairperson of Newry and Mourne CAB until its merger with Down CAB
Thorufg Diversity Challenges. He is on the Erupopen Board of the International Coalition of the Sites of Conscience(https://www.sitesofconscience.org/en/home/)

References

Year of birth missing (living people)
Living people
Alliance Party of Northern Ireland politicians
Members of Belfast City Council
Northern Ireland MPAs 1982–1986
Ulster Defence Regiment soldiers
Alliance Party of Northern Ireland councillors